The 2030 Summer Youth Olympics, officially known as the V Summer Youth Olympic Games will be the fifth edition of the Summer Youth Olympics, an international sports, education and cultural festival for teenagers, in a city designated by the International Olympic Committee (IOC).

Bidding process
The new IOC bidding process was approved at the 134th IOC Session in Lausanne, Switzerland. The key proposals driven by the relevant recommendations from Olympic Agenda 2020, are: 
Establish a permanent, ongoing dialogue to explore and create interest among cities/regions/countries and National Olympic Committees for any Olympic event
Create two Future Host Commissions (Summer and Winter Games) to oversee interest in future Olympic events and report to the IOC executive board
Give the IOC Session more influence by having non-EB members form part of the Future Host Commissions
IOC also modified Olympic Charter to increase flexibility by removing the date of election from 7 years before the games, and changing the host as a city to multiple cities, regions, or countries.

Future Host Summer Commissions
The full composition of the Summer Commissions, oversee interested hosts, or with potential hosts where the IOC may want to create interest, is as follows:

Dialogue stages
According to Future Host Commission terms of reference with rules of conduct, the new IOC bidding system is divided to 2 dialogue stages are:
Continuous Dialogue: Non-committal discussions between the IOC and Interested Parties (City/Region/Country/NOC interested in hosting) with regard to hosting future Olympic events.
Targeted Dialogue: Targeted discussions with one or more Interested Parties (called Preferred Host(s)), as instructed by the IOC Executive Board.  This follows a recommendation by the Future Host Commission as a result of Continuous Dialogue.

Timeline
Future Summer Host Commission meeting (16–17 January 2020)

Interested parties
The following are interested bidding parties for the 2030 Summer Youth Olympics, one of which took part in targeted dialogue with the IOC and Future Host Commission:

Americas
 Cartagena or Medellín, Colombia
In September 2019, the IOC President Thomas Bach met President of Republic of Colombia Iván Duque Márquez. Duque expressed a strong interest in a candidature (by choosing Cartagena) for the Youth Olympic Games in 2026, and they also discussed the programme of the Olympic Refuge Foundation in Colombia. However, when COVID-19 hit the world and Dakar's Olympic postponement to 2026, it was revealed that the year it qualified for the bid was 2030. In January 2020, it was told Medellín would bid again for the Summer Youth Olympics, after losing 2018 bid against Buenos Aires. Later in February, the Colombian Olympic Committee agreed on Medellín as the country's bid for the Olympics.

Asia
 Mumbai, India
In April 2018, the IOC President Thomas Bach met  President of the Indian Olympic Association Narinder Dhruv Batra on his India trip. The two leaders discussed the future of Olympic sport in the country - particularly looking ahead to the Olympic Games Tokyo 2020. They also spoke about a possible candidature of India to host the 2026 Summer Youth Olympics and a strong interest in the 2032 Summer Olympics and Paralympics. Later, IOC member Nita Ambani expressed a commitment for a Mumbai candidature for the Youth Olympic Games 2026, as well as a strong interest in the 2032 Summer Olympics, before it was awarded to Brisbane, Australia. Narendra Batra revealed that the 2026 Summer Youth Olympics will either be held in either Delhi or Bhubaneswar. Batra virtually ruled out Mumbai – the third city in the running – since the infrastructure there will have to be constructed from scratch.  India will also be hosting the 140th IOC Session in Mumbai in 2023. On 2 May 2020, at a press conference, Batra said that the IOA is serious in bidding for the event and will start the preparation of bidding documents when the COVID-19 pandemic eases.

 Bangkok–Chonburi, Thailand

In September 2017, Khun Ying Patama Leeswadtrakul suggested the country should bid the Youth Olympic Games firstly, the potentially awarded global sport events, after International Olympic Committee (IOC) awarded Paris and Los Angeles hosting 2024 and 2028 Summer Olympics respectively during 131st IOC Session. She was also elected as IOC member at this IOC session. Her idea was supported by the President of NOCT, Deputy Prime Minister Gen. Prawit Wongsuwan. Khun Ying Patama and Gen. Prawit made a strong interest to host next Summer Youth Olympics to the IOC President Thomas Bach during 2018 Winter Olympics in Pyeongchang, South Korea.

During 2018 SportAccord Convention in Bangkok, President Bach attended to this convention, and met the Prime Minister, Gen. Prayuth Chan-o-cha at Thai-Khu-Fah Building, Government House of Thailand. Gen. Prayuth offered to IOC for bidding for 2026 Summer Youth Olympics. 

On 2 October, the Cabinet of Thailand approved the plan of the bid 2026 Youth Olympics by Ministry of Tourism and Sports, Ministry of Tourism and Sports offered estimated income and revolving money from the games about 1,000 million Thai baht. On 12 October, Minister Weerasak Kowsurat, IOC member Khun Ying Patama Leeswadtrakul, Sport Authority of Thailand governor Kongsak Yodmanee, and ANOC member and NOCT advisor Somsak Leeswadtrakul visited to observe 2018 Summer Youth Olympics in Buenos Aires, Argentina. They also met IOC president Thomas Bach and chairman of organizing committee Leandro Larosa, discussing guideline for 2026 Youth Olympics bid. 

During 2020 Winter Youth Olympics in Lausanne, Switzerland on 17 January 2020, IOC member Khun Ying Patama Leeswadtrakul, Government representative — Minister of Tourism and Sports Pipat Ratchakitprakan, NOCT representative — Gen.Ronnachai Munchusoontornkul, and SAT Governor Kongsak Yodmanee met President of IOC Thomas Bach to deliver the governmental guarantee for 2026 Summer Youth Olympics and anti-doping engagements from the government after Thai Amateur Weightlifting Association suspended for multiple doping offences and Anti-doping lab in Thailand shut down.

On 15 May, a bid committee proposed a joint candidacy from Bangkok and Chonburi Province and planned to send their intention to bid to the International Olympic Committee (IOC) within the next week. A slogan of "by Youth with Youth for Youth" was also announced by a bid committee. On 5 June, a bid committee meeting took place for the second time. They received a letter form the International Olympic Committee (IOC) for a confirmation that Bangkok–Chonburi bid have already taken part in the permanent, ongoing dialogue of the new bidding process. In 2022, it was announced that a bid is set to be confirmed in the following year.

Europe
 Kazan, Russia
In December 2019, Minister of Sports of the Republic of Tatarstan, Vladimir Leonov confirmed that Kazan intended to apply for the 2026 Youth Olympics (which later went to Dakar, Senegal after the postponement of the games to 2026). Kazan hosted the 2013 Summer Universiade and several matches of the 2018 FIFA World Cup, and was the planned host of the 2022 Special Olympics World Winter Games. However, following the country's invasion of Ukraine in 2022, the IOC has barred any sporting events from being held in Russia or Belarus, causing the cancellation of the Special Olympics World Winter Games, and potentially affecting the efforts of the bid.

 Kyiv or Odessa, Ukraine
In August 2021, Ukrainian sports minister Vadym Huttsait announced that Ukraine could bid for the Youth Olympics of 2030 and the 2036 Summer Olympics with either the capital Kyiv or the port city Odesa. The country has never hosted the Olympics nor Youth Olympics. If awarded, it would mark the first time that the country has hosted a IOC sanctioned event, Ukraine could also bid for the 2028 or 2032 Winter Youth Olympic Games. Odesa is also bidding to host the Expo 2030. However, when Russia invading the country in February 2022, the plans for the bidding was significantly disrupted and, as of result, Russia and Belarus suspended from bidding any Olympic events by IOC.

Broadcasting rights
 – Grupo Globo
 – JTBC
 – JTBC
 – NBCUniversal

References

External links
Youth Olympic Games website

 
Youth Olympic Games by year
Summer Youth Olympics bids
2030 in youth sport
Summer Youth Olympics 2030
Y